Fairville is an unincorporated community in Saline County, in the U.S. state of Missouri.

History
Fairville was platted in 1856, and so named on account of the "fair" setting of the original town site. A post office called Fairville was established in 1869, and remained in operation until 1903.

References

Unincorporated communities in Saline County, Missouri
Unincorporated communities in Missouri